Aeonium cuneatum is a succulent species of flowering plant in the family Crassulaceae.  It has a large leaf rosette and no stem. The leaves are smooth but have a grey shine to the upper surface which can be rubbed. It offshoots easily which makes a large group of Aeoniums across the ground.  The flower is yellow and more open than the flowers of some other Aeonium species.

The Latin specific epithet cuneatum means "wedge-shaped;" this refers to the shape of the leaves.

References

Plants described in 1841
cuneatum